Dock6 (Dedicator of cytokinesis 6), also known as Zir1 is a large (~200 kDa) protein involved in intracellular signalling networks. It is a member of the DOCK-C subfamily of the DOCK family of guanine nucleotide exchange factors which function as activators of small G proteins.

Discovery
Dock6 was identified as one of a family of proteins which share high sequence similarity with Dock180, the archetypal member of the DOCK family. It has a similar domain arrangement to other DOCK proteins, with a DHR1 domain known in other proteins to bind phospholipids, and a DHR2 domain containing the GEF activity.

Function
There is currently very little information about the cellular role of this protein. However, Dock6 has been reported to exhibit dual GEF specificity towards the small G proteins Rac1 and Cdc42. It is the only DOCK family member reported to activate both of these G proteins. The same study also showed that transfection of the Dock6 DHR2 domain into N1E-115 neuroblastoma cells promoted Rac- and Cdc42-dependent neurite outgrowth, although the physiological significance of this has yet to be demonstrated.

References

Further reading